The Climate Fresk is a French nonprofit organization founded in December 2018 whose aim is to raise public awareness about climate change. It proposes a collaborative serious game based on 42 cards where the participants draw a Fresk which summarizes the work of the Intergovernmental Panel on Climate Change.

Origins and aims 
The Climate Fresk is created in 2015 by Cédric Ringenbach, former director of The Shift Project from 2010 to 2016, to raise public awareness about climate change. In December 2018, he creates an organization to spread the game and train facilitators.

Functioning of the workshop 

The workshop lasts three hours and is divided in three distinct phases. The first phase consists in discovering and linking the cards by cause-consequence relationships to build the Fresk  as explained in the IPCC reports. The second phase is creative: the participants decorate the Fresk and choose a title. The last phase is a debrief enabling a discussion about players' feelings, positions, questions and both individual and collective solutions.

Audience 
The workshops are opened to everyone but the game has been initially spread out in higher education and companies. Suez Environnement is the first company to announce a partnership with the Climate Fresk in June 2020 offering a workshop to every of its  employees worldwide. This announcement is shortly followed by the one of EDF which engages in a partnership with the organization to perform the workshop for its  employees.

References

Appendices

See also 
 The Shift Project
 IPCC
 Climate change

External links 
 

Organizations based in Paris
Environmental organizations established in 2018
Environmental organizations based in France